Henry Thomas Howard (16 January 1808 – 29 January 1851) was a British soldier and politician.

The second son of Thomas Howard, 16th Earl of Suffolk, he was educated at Charterhouse School. On 21 July 1825, he purchased a commission as an ensign in the 58th Regiment of Foot. He later became a lieutenant, and purchased an unattached captaincy on 9 November 1830. He was returned as member of parliament for Cricklade in 1841. On 24 June 1845, he married Georgiana Maria, daughter of Sir John Guise, 3rd Baronet, at Rendcomb Park, Gloucestershire. He died in 1851 at Beauchamp, Gloucestershire.

References

External links 
 

1808 births
1851 deaths
58th Regiment of Foot officers
Henry Thomas Howard
Members of the Parliament of the United Kingdom for Cricklade
People educated at Charterhouse School
UK MPs 1841–1847
Younger sons of earls